Pnau is an Australian dance music trio originating from Sydney. The trio, a duo before 2016, consists of the musicians Nick Littlemore (vocals, production), Peter Mayes (guitar, production) and Sam Littlemore (production), with the latter joining in 2016. Pnau has achieved multiple successes with their award-winning 1999 first album Sambanova and the widely acclaimed 2007 release Pnau. Pnau is also recognised for a heavily publicised apprenticeship under the musician Elton John, who signed the duo after listening to the Pnau album. Several of Pnau's later projects have had John's involvement, such as the album Soft Universe and an album of Pnau recreations of Elton John's hits called Good Morning to the Night.

Apart from being a member of Pnau, Nick Littlemore also appears as one half of the project Empire of the Sun, which has had multiple chart-topping singles. In November 2016, the new line-up released "Chameleon", the first single from their album Changa.

Biography

1990s: Beginnings
Pnau formed in Sydney, New South Wales by Nick Littlemore and Peter Mayes. The two met at secondary school at the age of 12 years old and began performing together in the mid-1990s, initially playing acid, house music, and trance music. Littlemore recalled meeting Mayes when he was 10; "He tripped me over. We hated each other for a couple years and then we started sneaking out and going to raves when we were about 13 and we formed a bond over intense music." Littlemore and Mayes created their first album when they were in their mid-teens. "It was called Fractal Geometric Spaces Made of Light," Littlemore remembers, "Which is probably why it was never picked up."

The duo's first commercially available tracks were a pair of nine-minute tracks, "Frisk" and "Anthropophagi", that led off doof@cybersonic.aust.com – an underground acid trance compilation album distributed by cult electronic label Creative Vibes in 1996. Pnau would then feature on another Creative Vibes project, 1998's compilation record Evolutionary Vibes III: The Evolution Will Not Be Televised, with the song "Discone".

1999–2002: Sambanova

In July 1999, Pnau officially released their debut album Sambanova under the independent label Peking Duck. It was recorded in a bedroom studio and they state they only expected it to sell "a few thousand copies". The album was pulled from record stores for using uncleared samples, but re-released in June 2000 and peaked inside the ARIA top 40. In October 2000, at the ARIA Music Awards of 2000, the album won Best Dance Release. In a 2003 interview with The Age, Mayes said that they had no understanding of sample clearances due to their naïveté in the music business. Mayes claimed that the album's recall did seriously affect their commercial sales. Littlemore later contested "They screwed us over for $300,000. Warners didn't; another third party did. But that happens. We're still here, we're still doing it."

Pnau went on to make many live appearances at music festivals like Big Day Out in 2001 and Homebake in 2002. During this time, they garnered a reputation for their lively performances.

2003–2007: Again

In October 2003, Pnau released their second studio album, Again. The album was not a commercial success and Littlemore was later quoted as Again being "the worst record I've ever done". Littlemore has since retracted the statement. When asked if he still considered Again to be his worst record, Littlemore responded, "Well next to Soft Universe. They're sort of on par." Littlemore further explained that his opinions are influenced by the albums' commercial success, which is an easy headspace for him to get into since "everyone loves Empire of the Sun, it's sold 1.1 million records." Despite the seemingly unfavorable album response, several tracks received considerable acclaim - the most noteworthy being We Love The Fresh Kills which was a significantly popular single for the duo at the time. However, because of Agains lackluster success the pair parted ways for some time to work with other artists such as Robbie Williams, Van She, and Lost Valentinos.

2007–2009: Pnau and Empire of the Sun

In 2007, the duo reunited and wrote over two-hundred songs together and started to lay down an entire album with Nick Littlemore's brother Sam Littlemore as producer. They sent a work-in-progress track to long-time friend and collaborator Luke Steele, who sent back the track with his own vocals. After receiving the track, the Littlemore brothers and Mayes agreed to scrap almost everything they had laid down to focus on a more vocally centered album. The track became known as "With You Forever" and the finalised album was released under the self-titled name Pnau. The album not only featured vocal work from Luke Steele and Nick Littlemore himself, but also had many guest appearances such as Ladyhawke, Feadz, Nik Yannika from Lost Valentinos and Michael DeFrancesco from Van She. The album was released to high critical acclaim and gained unexpected favorable attention from Elton John, declaring it to be the greatest record he'd heard in ten years.

Inspired by their track "With You Forever", Pnau began work on a collaboration with Luke Steele, which would call themselves Empire of the Sun. Originally titled Steelemore, Empire of the Sun released it debut single in August 2008 titled "Walking on a Dream" and its debut album in October 2008 with Walking on a Dream. Nick Littlemore and Luke Steele took the roles of bandmates, while Peter Mayes assumed the role of producer. Some critics were quick to note that the band sounded more like a work of Pnau than Luke Steele's band The Sleepy Jackson. Empire of the Sun has achieved international success having been certified 2× Platinum in Australia and gold in the United Kingdom, as well as winning eleven ARIA awards. Pnau makes it clear on their Myspace numerous times that not only is Empire of the Sun a side project of theirs, but that they are also the producers. Regarding Empire of the Sun, in early 2009 news began appearing that Nick Littlemore had disappeared. The reality had been that Nick Littlemore had left Empire of the Sun to begin work on the fourth Pnau album along with Elton John.

2010–2011: Soft Universe

In 2010, Pnau's track "Baby" (Remixed by Breakbot) appeared in the release of Sony Computer Entertainment's "Gran Turismo 5", in the Background Music (BGM) playlist.

In February 2011, Pnau released "The Truth", the lead single from their forthcoming fourth studio album, Soft Universe. Soft Universe was released in June 2011 and peaked at number 13 on the ARIA Charts. Littlemore has described it as a very "emotional" album, inspired by the breakup with his long-time girlfriend. With input from Elton John, the album features Littlemore singing all the vocals on the album along with tracks co-written with fellow Aussie artist Martin Craft and producer Mark Saunders. The album was positively received, although mainly critics expressed discontent with the lack of the "endearing weirdness of previous Pnau and Empire releases." The Soft Universe album received the Australian Independent Record (AIR) Award for Best Independent Dance/Electronica Album.

2012–2015: Good Morning to the Night

On 10 March 2012, the first remix track from the anticipated, upcoming Elton John rework album commissioned for Pnau was leaked, initially airing on Pete Tong's BBC Radio 1 broadcast. In July 2012 two singles were released from the album, "Good Morning to the Night" and "Sad", while the album Good Morning to the Night was released and reaching number 1 on the UK Albums Chart.

In November 2013 French duo Faul & Wad Ad released "Changes" credited to vs. Pnau. The song samples Pnau's "Baby" and reached the top ten in numerous countries across Europe.

2016–2018: Changa

In November 2016, Pnau released "Chameleon" as the lead single from the upcoming fifth studio album. The song peaked at number 4 on the ARIA Charts and was certified 4× platinum. At the ARIA Music Awards of 2017, the song won the groups their second ARIA Award for Best Dance Release. Changa was released in November 2017 and peaked at number 11 on the ARIA Charts. The album spawned two more singles "Go Bang" and "Changa". At the ARIA Music Awards of 2018, "Go Bang" won the group's third ARIA Award for Best Dance Release.

2019–present: sixth studio album
The band released the single "Solid Gold" on 2 May 2019. The song continues Pnau's collaboration with Kira Divine on vocals, and also features additional vocals by Marques Toliver. The band hosted a live chat on their Facebook page to support the release. In August 2019, the band released the single "All of Us". In December 2020, the band worked with Ladyhawke again and released the single "River".

In August 2021, Pnau produced a remix medley of several Elton John songs along with Dua Lipa, titled "Cold Heart (Pnau remix)". The single charted in many countries worldwide, becoming their 3rd top 10 in Australia and their second in the UK, as well as their first song to chart in the US.

On June 24, 2022, the band released the remix of “Don’t Fly Away” by Elvis Presley on the soundtrack to the movie Elvis.

Pronunciations
One accepted pronunciation of Pnau is "pah-now". The name is commonly accented to simulate the sound of a gunshot. Nick Littlemore explained the name was the result of an instance when he was speaking in tongues. After shouting gibberish for half an hour, Littlemore decided Pnau would be an appropriate band name.

Another theory on the pronunciation, according to one interview with the pair, is "pah-nyeow". The group has on other occasions explained that the name "rhymes with meow".

Discography
Studio albums

Remix albums

SinglesNotes'''

Promotional singles

List of notable remixes

Awards and nominations
AIR Awards
The Australian Independent Record Awards (commonly known informally as AIR Awards) is an annual awards night to recognise, promote and celebrate the success of Australia's Independent Music sector.

! 
|-
| rowspan="2" | AIR Awards of 2011
|Soft Universe 
| Best Independent Dance/Electronic Album
| 
| rowspan="2" | 
|-
| "Solid Ground"
| Best Independent Dance/Electronic Single
| 
|-
| rowspan="2" | AIR Awards of 2018
|Changa 
| Best Independent Dance/Electronic Album
| 
| rowspan="2" |
|-
| "Go Bang"
| Best Independent Dance/Electronic Single
| 
|-
| AIR Awards of 2020
|"Solid Gold" 
| Best Independent Dance/Electronic Single
| 
| 
|-
| AIR Awards of 2021
| "River" (featuring Ladyhawke)
| Best Independent Dance, Electronica or Club Single
| 
| 
|-
| AIR Awards of 2022
| "Stranger Love" (with Budjerah)
| Best Independent Dance, Electronica or Club Single
| 
| 

ARIA Awards

The ARIA Music Awards is an annual awards ceremony that recognises excellence, innovation, and achievement across all genres of Australian music. They commenced in 1987. Pnau have won 3 awards from 17 nominations.

|-
| rowspan="1"| 2000 ||rowspan="1"| Sambanova || Best Dance Release || 
|-
| rowspan="2"| 2008 ||rowspan="1"| Pnau || Best Dance Release ||  
|-
| "Baby" (James Littlemore) || Best Video ||  
|-
| rowspan="1"| 2011 ||rowspan="1"| Soft Universe || Best Dance Release ||  
|-
| rowspan="2"| 2017 ||rowspan="2"| "Chameleon" || Best Dance Release ||  
|-
| Song of the Year ||  
|-
| rowspan="7"| 2018 ||rowspan="1"| Changa || Album of the Year ||  
|-
|rowspan="4"| "Go Bang" || Best Group ||  
|-
| Best Dance Release ||  
|-
| Best Independent Release ||  
|-
| Song of the Year ||  
|-
| Toby Pike and Nick Littlemore - Pnau "Go Bang" || Best Video ||  
|-
| Pnau Changa Australian Tour ||Best Australian Live Act||  
|-
| rowspan="2"| 2019 || "Solid Gold" || Best Dance Release ||  
|-
| Clemens Habicht - "Solid Gold" ||  Best Video ||  
|-
| rowspan="2"| 2020 || Imogen Grist, Nick Littlemore for "Lucky" (featuring Vlossom) || Best Video ||  
|-
| All of Us Australian Tour || Best Australian Live Act ||  
|-

APRA Awards
The APRA Awards are held in Australia and New Zealand by the Australasian Performing Right Association to recognise songwriting skills, sales and airplay performance by its members annually.

|-
| rowspan="2"| 2018
| rowspan="2"| "Chameleon"
| Dance Work of the Year
| 
|-
| Most Played Australian Work
| 
|-
| rowspan="2"| 2019
| rowspan="2"| "Go Bang"
| Dance Work of the Year
| 
|-
| Most Played Australian Work
| 
|-
| 2020
| "Solid Gold"
| Most Performed Dance Work of the Year
| 
|-
| 2021
| "All of Us" (featuring Ollie Gabriel)
| Most Performed Dance Work of the Year
| 
|-
| 2022
| "River" (featuring Ladyhawke)
| Most Performed Dance Work of the Year
| 
|-

J Award
The J Awards are an annual series of Australian music awards that were established by the Australian Broadcasting Corporation's youth-focused radio station Triple J. They commenced in 2005.

|-
| J Awards of 2007
|Pnau| Australian Album of the Year
| 

MTV Europe Music Awards
The MTV Europe Music Awards is an award presented by Viacom International Media Networks to honour artists and music in pop culture.

|-
| 2017
| themselves
| Best Australian Act
| 
|-

National Live Music Awards
The National Live Music Awards (NLMAs) are a broad recognition of Australia's diverse live industry, celebrating the success of the Australian live scene. The awards commenced in 2016.

|-
| National Live Music Awards of 2019
| Pnau
| Live Electronic Act (or DJ) of the Year
| 
|-

Rolling Stone Australia Awards
The Rolling Stone Australia Awards are awarded annually in January or February by the Australian edition of Rolling Stone'' magazine for outstanding contributions to popular culture in the previous year.

! 
|-
| 2022
| Pnau
| Rolling Stone Global Award
| 
|
|-

References

External links

Pnau Interview with Alchemy, SBS Radio 2008-04-30
"Pnau and then", The Age, 17 October 2003
Discogs entry for Pnau
Video from the PNAU live in France for the before of the Trans Musicales festival
Review of Good Morning to the Night

1999 establishments in Australia
ARIA Award winners
Australian electronic music groups
Australian indie pop groups
Australian musical trios
Male musical duos
Musical groups established in 1999
Musical groups from Sydney
Sony Music artists